Eldevina "Kika" Materula (born 1982) is a Mozambican oboist who has served as Minister of Culture and Tourism in the Cabinet of Mozambique since 19 January 2020.

Life
Materula was born in Maputo in 1982. At the age of seven she began studying piano and recorder at the National School of Music. In 1995, aged 13, she began studying the oboe, under an agreement with the Escola Profissional de Música de Évora, in Portugal , which selected her, along with five other students, to study at that institution.

In 2016, she was made an Officer of the Order of Prince Henry by the President of Portugal.

References

1982 births
Living people
Women oboists
Officers of the Order of Prince Henry
Women government ministers of Mozambique
Mozambican musicians
21st-century Mozambican women politicians
21st-century Mozambican politicians
Government ministers of Mozambique